Satanás (Spanish for Satan) is a 2007 Colombian film directed by Andi Baiz. It is adapted from the novel of the same title by Mario Mendoza Zambrano which is based on the spree killing committed by Campo Elías Delgado that took place in Bogotá in 1986. It was Colombia's submission to the 80th Academy Awards for the Academy Award for Best Foreign Language Film, but was not accepted as a nominee.

Plot
The film follows the lives of three characters, Eliseo, Paola, and Father Ernesto, living in the city of Bogota, Colombia, in the mid 1980s.

Eliseo, a middle-aged English teacher and veteran of the Vietnam War, has  difficulties creating and maintaining relationships (especially with women). He lives with his aging mother, Blanca, but they detest each other and argue constantly. Eliseo is also irritated by his neighbor and landlord, Beatriz, who keeps asking him for money for her charitable works. He always coldly refuses, and is treated rudely at the local store as a result.

Eliseo works as a teacher of English, and one of his students is 15-year-old Natalia. He develops a crush on Natalia, who is gentle and polite during lessons. Invited to Natalia's birthday party, Eliseo is angry when he realizes that Natalia has a boyfriend, Esteban.

After a heated argument with his mother, Eliseo loses his temper, shoots her, and then sets the place on fire. On his way out he encounters Beatriz and he kills her too. Arriving at Natalia's house, he viciously attacks Natalia and her mother, killing them both. In the evening, he visits an old friend, a librarian who has always been kind to him. He tells her that he is leaving town and thanks her for her friendship. From there, he goes on the last leg of his killing spree, the high class restaurant, "Pozzetto". He chooses an expensive meal and a few drinks, and consumes them both. He pays the bill, leaving a big tip. He then goes into the bathroom and prepares himself for the upcoming massacre. When he comes out, he shoots a pianist playing “Piano Sonata No. 20 in A major, D. 959” before going around the restaurant shooting at customers and staff indiscriminately.
 
Paola is an attractive young woman who hates her job in the marketplace. She accepts an offer from an acquaintance to become a member of a gang of robbers. Her job is to act as bait to attract wealthy men in a bar, incapacitate them by putting Scopolamine in their drinks, and then lure them into a cab. Her accomplices then drive the victim to an ATM and steal his money. She is very good in this role, but is concerned about the welfare of her victims. She gets in a cab to go home one night after a successful operation, but the driver and an accomplice kidnap her and take her to an old taxi shop where they assault and rape her. She is deeply traumatized and eventually asks members of the gang to kill the two people that raped her. The rapists are successfully located and are murdered. Regretting their deaths and all the robberies committed before, she quits the gang and gets a job as a waitress at Pozzetto, an Italian restaurant. There she becomes one of Eliseo's victims.

Father Ernesto is a priest involved in a passionate love affair with his housekeeper. He is conscientious in his duties, but tormented by his sexual urges. Father Ernesto is trying to help a disturbed woman with three children who has come to his church seeking spiritual guidance. He goes to get food for them but when he returns they are gone. She returns some time later, alone and covered in blood, having murdered her children "to release them" from this life of evil. The scene anticipates the slaughter at the end of the movie. Father Ernesto visits the woman in prison where her demented diatribes predict future events. Traumatized by his encounters with the woman and unable to restrain his carnal desires, Ernesto loses his faith and refuses to go on as a priest. He resigns his position and takes his housekeeper for a date at a restaurant. There they are both killed by Eliseo.

Cast 
 Damián Alcázar as Eliseo
 Marcela Mar as Paola
 Blas Jaramillo as Father Ernesto
 Teresa Gutierrez as Blanca, Eliseo's mother
 Vicky Hernandez as Beatriz, Eliseo and Blanca's annoying neighbor
 Martina Garcia as Natalia, Eliseo's English Student
 Patricia Castañeda as Valeria
 Carolina Gaitan as Natalia's friend
 Marcela Gallego as Natalia's mother
 Isabel Gaona as Irene

Prizes and Festivals

See also
Cinema of Colombia
List of submissions to the 80th Academy Awards for Best Foreign Language Film

References

External links 
 
 Colombia's New Urban Realists (article about Mario Mendoza)
 Website in English of the 2006 Colombian film “Satanas”
 Satanás The Movie – Official Website in Spanish
 A review in English of Satanas – the film
 Satanás (2007) En las fauces del mal – ochoymedio – revista en línea de cine (SPANISH SITE)
 Jackson Hole Film Festival 2008: Satanas
 Satanás Profile of a Killer | 2008 Palm Springs International Film Festival | Andrés Baiz | Colombia
 San Sebastian Film Festival: Satanas (film)
 Analisis y Comentarios sobre cine Colombiano: Satanas (SPANISH site)

2007 films
2007 drama films
Films based on Colombian novels
Colombian drama films